Carmine Molaro (born 20 February 1975) is an Italian former boxer. He competed in the men's flyweight event at the 1996 Summer Olympics.

References

External links
 

1975 births
Living people
Italian male boxers
Olympic boxers of Italy
Boxers at the 1996 Summer Olympics
Boxers from Naples
Mediterranean Games gold medalists for Italy
Mediterranean Games medalists in boxing
Competitors at the 1997 Mediterranean Games
Flyweight boxers
20th-century Italian people